Kyle Krisiloff (born March 3, 1986) is an American professional racing driver. He is the son of former Champ Car racer, Steve Krisiloff, the nephew of Tony George, and the grandson of Mari Hulman George. He became the youngest BMX rider in the United States, when he began racing BMX bicycles at just three years old. He raced quarter midgets from 1995 to 1999, winning over 320 features and nine Grand National Championships.

Racing career

Born in Trenton, New Jersey, Krisiloff made his home in Carmel, Indiana. In 2000, Krisiloff raced in Superkarts USA competition, winning two races and two pole positions. In 2001, he competed in twenty-two SCCA Formula Ford events, winning six races, six poles, and national championship at the historic SCCA Runoffs (The youngest ever at 14 years of age). In 2002, he competed in Toyota Atlantic for the last six races of the year. He ran the full season in 2003, placing 10th in points.

In 2004, Krisiloff signed a driver development contract with Hendrick Motorsports and ran three ARCA Re/Max Series races with Bobby Gerhart Racing and ten ASA races as part of the agreement. He started 3rd and finished 9th in his ARCA series debut at Lake Erie Speedway, and then finished 2nd at Nashville Superspeedway, before winning at Chicagoland Speedway in only his third series start. In ten ASA starts, he recorded a single top ten finish with a 4th at Lowe's Motor Speedway.  He ran fourteen ARCA races in 2005, recording three top fives, five top tens, and two poles. He also competed in three NASCAR Busch Series races in the No. 5 Hendrick Motorsports Chevrolet. After leaving Hendrick Motorsports in 2005, Krisiloff moved to the Craftsman Truck Series in 2006, driving for Billy Ballew Motorsports, before parting ways due to financial conflicts.

In January 2007, a partnership including Carl Haas, Travis Carter, Mari Hulman George, and Michael T. Lanigan announced that it was purchasing ppc Racing and would field the No. 14 Ford Fusion in the Busch Series with Krisiloff as the driver.  The car was to be sponsored by Clabber Girl, which is part of the Hulman-George family holdings, but later gained sponsorship from Walgreens and Eli Lilly and Company. His best finishes were 5th at Talladega and 6th at Montreal. In 2008, he drove six races for Chip Ganassi Racing in the No. 41 Polaroid Dodge, earning a best finish of 24th at Phoenix.

Motorsports career results

SCCA National Championship Runoffs

NASCAR
(key) (Bold – Pole position awarded by qualifying time. Italics – Pole position earned by points standings or practice time. * – Most laps led.)

Nationwide Series

Craftsman Truck Series

ARCA Re/Max Series
(key) (Bold – Pole position awarded by qualifying time. Italics – Pole position earned by points standings or practice time. * – Most laps led.)

References

External links
 

Living people
1986 births
Sportspeople from Trenton, New Jersey
Racing drivers from Indiana
Racing drivers from Indianapolis
NASCAR drivers
ARCA Menards Series drivers
Atlantic Championship drivers
People from Carmel, Indiana
American Speed Association drivers
SCCA National Championship Runoffs winners
Hendrick Motorsports drivers
Chip Ganassi Racing drivers
Hulman-George_family